Lipson is a ward in the city of Plymouth, England.

Lipson may also refer to:
 Lipson, South Australia, a locality
Lipson Cove, a bay in South Australia
Lipson Island, an island in South Australia
Lipson Island Conservation Park, a protected area in South Australia

People with the surname
 D. Herbert Lipson, American magazine publisher
 Ephraim Lipson (1888–1960), British economic historian
 Henry Lipson (1910–1991), British physicist
 Hod Lipson, American robotics researcher
 Stephen Lipson, music producer and guitarist
 Thomas Lipson (ca.1784-1863), Royal Navy officer and South Australian government official

See also
 Lipton (surname)